Fiona Stewart may refer to:

Fiona Stewart (author) (born 1966), Australian author and euthanasia activist
Fiona Stewart (event director) UK-based owner and director of Green Man Festival